Every Day's a Holiday  is a 1937 American comedy film starring and co-written by Mae West, directed by A. Edward Sutherland, and released by Paramount Pictures. The film, released on December 18, 1937, also starred Edmund Lowe, Charles Winninger, and Charles Butterworth. This was West's last film under her Paramount contract, after which she went on to make My Little Chickadee (1940) for Universal Pictures and The Heat's On (1943) for Columbia Pictures.

Plot
In turn-of-the-century New York City, con artist Peaches O'Day (West) gets into trouble with the law for trying to sell the Brooklyn Bridge, but Jim McCarey (Lowe), a police captain, likes her enough that he lets her off with a promise from Peaches to leave town. She hatches a scheme instead with the wealthy Van Doon (Winninger) and butler Graves (Butterworth) to perform as a singer, calling herself Fifi, disguised in a black wig.

Quade (Lloyd Nolan), a chief of police with political ambitions, makes a pass at "Fifi" and is rejected. In anger, he orders the club closed. Capt. McCarey refuses and becomes Quade's rival, even persuaded to run against him for mayor.

Before giving a speech at Madison Square Garden during the campaign, McCarey is kidnapped. He escapes just in time and the publicity is helpful in his election victory. It turns out that Peaches planned the whole thing, resulting in a romantic relationship with the new mayor of New York.

Cast
 Mae West - Peaches O'Day
 Edmund Lowe - Capt. McCarey
 Charles Butterworth - Larmadou Graves
 Charles Winninger - Van Reighle Van Pelter Van Doon
 Walter Catlett - Nifty Bailey
 Lloyd Nolan - John Quade
 Louis Armstrong - Himself
 George Rector - Himself
 Herman Bing - Fritz Krausmeyer
 Roger Imhof - Trigger Mike
 Chester Conklin - Cabby
 Lucien Prival - Danny the Dip
 Adrian Morris - Henchman
 Francis McDonald - Henchman
 John Indrisano - Henchman

Awards
The film was nominated an Academy Award for Best Art Direction by Wiard Ihnen.

References

External links
 
 

1937 films
1937 comedy films
American black-and-white films
American comedy films
Films directed by A. Edward Sutherland
Films set in 1900
Films set in New York City
Paramount Pictures films
Films with screenplays by Mae West
1930s English-language films
1930s American films